Steven Yates (born 26 July 1983) is a New Zealand rugby union player who played for the New Zealand Sevens team. He currently plays for Japanese club Toyota Verblitz.

On the 27th of June 2019, Yates was arrested at his home in Nagoya under suspicion of cocaine possession.

Career highlights
New Zealand Sevens 2007–2008
Crusaders 2006
Canterbury Air New Zealand Cup 2004 - 2007
Canterbury Sevens 2004, 2005
Canterbury B 2003

References

1983 births
Living people
New Zealand rugby union players
Toyota Verblitz players
Canterbury rugby union players
Crusaders (rugby union) players
Rugby union wings
New Zealand expatriate rugby union players
New Zealand expatriate sportspeople in Japan
Expatriate rugby union players in Japan
New Zealand international rugby sevens players
New Zealand male rugby sevens players